Catadau is a municipality in the comarca of Ribera Alta in the Valencian Community, Spain.

References

Commons has image archives on Catadau: 

Municipalities in the Province of Valencia
Ribera Alta (comarca)